The blue-breasted blue flycatcher (Cyornis herioti), also known as the blue-breasted flycatcher, is a species of bird in the family Muscicapidae. It is endemic to the Philippines.  Its natural habitat is subtropical or tropical moist lowland forests. The rufous-breasted blue flycatcher (Cyornis camarinensis) was formerly considered to be a subspecies.

References

External links

 

blue-breasted blue flycatcher
Birds of Luzon
blue-breasted blue flycatcher
blue-breasted blue flycatcher
Taxonomy articles created by Polbot